WMFS (680 kHz) is a commercial AM radio station located in Memphis, Tennessee.  WMFS airs sports radio programming branded as "ESPN 680AM Sports Radio Memphis".  The station simulcasts with WMFS-FM 92.9.  WMFS is home to the Geoff Calkins Show, the Jason and John Show, the Eric Hasseltine Show, and the Gary Parrish Show. As of the 2007 baseball season, WMFS has become the home of St. Louis Cardinals broadcasts in the Memphis area. It also broadcasts Tennessee Volunteers football and basketball games.

The station's license is held by Audacy, Inc. It is one of six radio properties in the Memphis market held by Audacy; the others are WMC-FM, WRVR-FM, WMC, WLFP, and WMFS-FM. WMFS maintains studios in the Audacy complex in Southeast Memphis, and has a transmitter tower in North Memphis.

History
WGBC signed on in 1924. At that time it belonged to First Baptist Church of Memphis. The Memphis Press-Scimitar bought the station in 1937 and changed the letters to WMPS, moving it to Columbia Mutual Tower on Court Square. WMC, owned by rival paper Commercial Appeal, carried the Red Network. In the 1930s, WMPS aired broadcasts of the NBC Radio Blue Network, including Bob Hope, the NBC Symphony Orchestra, the Metropolitan Opera radio broadcasts, and Amos and Andy. Local programming on WMPS included country and western music (often called "Hillbilly" music). Kay Starr and Eddy Arnold gave some of their earliest performances on WMPS, which also aired The Carter Family, Jimmie Rodgers, Bill and Charlie Monroe, and Bob Wills. "Smiling" Eddie Hill of The Grand Ole Opry went to work at WMPS in 1947, leading the house band that included Ira and Charlie Louvin, who wrote songs for Bill Monroe, Emmylou Harris, James Taylor, Mark Knopfler, Alison Krauss and Ray Charles. Johnny Cash later recalled hearing the Eddie Hill band featuring the Louvin Brothers on the radio, and program director Bob Neal played his "Hey Porter" and "Cry! Cry! Cry!" in 1955. Sonny James later led another band which performed on WMPS.

Plough, Incorporated bought WMPS in 1948, and Radio Center was finished in 1949 and later used for WDIA. WMPS also switched to ABC Radio.

Eddie Hill returned to WSM in 1951 and Charlie Louvin served in The Korean War, but Ira Louvin stayed at WMPS as a DJ. The Blackwood Brothers performed on WMPS until the station switched to Top 40 in 1954. By that time, Elvis Presley had already heard the Blackwood Brothers on the radio and had become a fan. Neal continued a country and western show. When Neal left, WMPS and competing Top 40 WHBQ were the no. 1 and no. 2 stations in Memphis for the next 15 years, but radio had changed. Top 40 DJs were different, and they could not play just any song. They had to go by what was actually selling.

Later, though, WMPS began to emphasize personalities once again. WMPS soon played the "Memphis Sound" of blues, soul and funk Roy Mack worked with the Devilles and changed their names to The Box Tops. Another WMPS DJ who became well known was Rick Dees, who recorded "Disco Duck" while at WMPS. He was fired from WMPS because of conflict of interest and suspected payola, but WHBQ hired him, eventually winning the Top 40 wars before the format left AM. WMPS switched to country music in 1978.   In 1983, WMPS switched to an R&B format attempting to compete with WDIA and WLOK.  They also changed the call letters to WKDJ.

Plough later sold WMPS and the new owners changed the call letters several times. In 1992, WKDJ began simulcasting FM sister station WODZ and their oldies format (which later flipped to country in February 1993). In October 1993, WOGY switched to a classic soul format as "The Juice." (The WMPS letters returned in 2001 to another area station.) The format would later be changed to adult standards as "Easy 680".

WJCE became WWTQ and added Air America progressive talk radio on January 28, 2005. 
In late 2007, Air America was dropped, with the station flipping to its current sports talk format, and changing call letters to WSMB.

WSMB became an ESPN affiliate on August 4, 2008. Fox Sports moved from WSMB to KQPN at 730 AM the next day.

In 2009, a simulcast was added on FM, at 92.9 WMFS-FM.

Beginning in the 2011–12 station, WMFS became the flagship station for the NBA's Memphis Grizzlies.

Call sign history
The station picked up the historic WSMB from New Orleans' Entercom-owned 1350 AM in November 2006 when it was resigned as WWWL. Previous call signs include WWTQ (1/28/2005), WJCE (11/26/1993),  WOGY (6/14/1993), and WEZI (2/21/1992).

References

External links

MFS
Sports radio stations in the United States
Radio stations established in 1924
Audacy, Inc. radio stations